Kyrgyz Premier League is the division of professional football in Kyrgyzstan. It was created in 1992 after the Dissolution of the Soviet Union. The league is composed of eight teams. The most successful team is Dordoi Bishkek who have won the league thirteen times.

The winner of the league earns a spot in the AFC Cup preliminary qualifying round, Asia's second highest club continental competition. The team with the worst record at the end of each season is demoted to the Kyrgyzstan League Second Level.

Starting from the 2019 season, the league was rebranded as the Kyrgyz Premier League.

Previous winners

Soviet-era champions
Champions were:

1934: Frunze City Team
1935: Dinamo Frunze
1936: Burevestnik Frunze
1937s: Spartak Frunze
1937f: Burevestnik Frunze
1938s: Dinamo Frunze
1938f: Dinamo Frunze
1939–44: not played
1945: Frunze City Team
1946: Spartak Frunze
1947: Spartak Frunze
1948: Spartak Frunze
1949: Burevestnik Frunze
1950: Spartak Frunze
1951: Frunze City Team
1952: Dinamo Frunze
1953: Osh Region Team
1954: Frunze City Team
1955: Frunze City Team
1956: Frunze City Team
1957: Frunze Region Team
1958: Torpedo Frunze
1959: Torpedo Frunze
1960: SKIF Frunze
1961: Mayli-Say City Team
1962: Alga Kalininskoye
1963: Alga Kalininskoye
1964: Selmashevets Frunze
1965: Alga Kalininskoye
1966: Selmashevets Frunze
1967: Alga Kalininskoye
1968: Selmashevets Frunze
1969: Instrumentalshchik Frunze
1970: Selmashevets Frunze
1971: Elektrik Frunze
1972: Selmashevets Frunze
1973: Selmashevets Frunze
1974: Tekstilshchik Osh
1975: Instrumentalshchik Frunze
1976: Stroitel Jalal-Abad
1977: Selmashevets Frunze
1978: Instrumentalshchik Frunze
1979: Selmashevets Frunze
1980: Instrumentalshchik Frunze
1981: Instrumentalshchik Frunze
1982: Instrumentalshchik Frunze
1983: Instrumentalshchik Frunze
1984: Instrumentalshchik Frunze
1985: not played
1986: Selmashevets Frunze
1987: Selmashevets Frunze
1988: Selmashevets Frunze
1989: Selmashevets Frunze
1990: Selmashevets Frunze
1991: Selmashevets Frunze

Since independence
Champions since the country's independence were:

2021–22 clubs

Performances

Performance by club

League participation 
As of 2022, 62 clubs have participated.
Note: The tallies below include up to the 2022 season. Teams denoted in bold are current participants.

 28 seasons: Alga Bishkek
 24 seasons: Alay, Dordoi Bishkek
 21 seasons: Kara-Balta
 20 seasons: Abdysh-Ata Kant
 18 seasons: Neftchi Kochkor-Ata
 13 seasons: Zhashtyk-Ak-Altyn Kara-Suu
 11 seasons: Dzhalal-Abad, Shakhtyor Kyzyl-Kiya
 10 seasons: Dinamo MVD Bishkek
 9 seasons: Dinamo-UVD Osh, RUOR-Guardia Bishkek
 6 seasons: Ala-Too Naryn, Issyk-Kol Karakol, SKA-Alay Osh
 5 seasons: Dinamo-Manas-SKIF Bishkek, Ilbirs Bishkek, Kaganat, Rotor Bishkek, Sher Bishkek
 4 seasons: Ak-Maral Tokmok, Ak-Zhol, Kant-Oil, Orto-Nur Sokuluk
 3 seasons: Aldiyer Kurshab, Kant, Kara-Shoro Uzgen, KG United, Polyot Bishkek, Talas
 2 seasons: Abdysh-Ata-99, Ala-Buka, Dordoi-Plaza, Energetik Karaköl, Instrumentalshchik Bishkek, Shakhtyor Tashkömür, Shoro Bishkek, Team Kyrgyzstan U-21, Uchkun Kara-Suu
 1 season: Ak-Bura Osh, Alamudun, Alga-2 Bishkek, Ata-Spor Bishkek, Bakit Mailuu-Suu, Bazar-Korgon-Babur, Belovodskoye, Dinamo-Chuy UVD, Dinamo Kant, Ekolog Bishkek, Energetik Bishkek, Kelechek Osh, Kolos Nizhnechuyskoye, Lokomotiv Dzhalal-Abad, Metallurg Kadamjay, Muras-Sport Bishkek, Nookat, Nur-Batken, Olimpia-85 Bishkek, Talant, Team Kyrgyzstan U-17, Tsementnik Kant, Zhashtyk Osh

References and notes

External links
League at fifa.com

 
1
Top level football leagues in Asia
Sports leagues established in 1992